Rubropsichia brasiliana is a species of moth of the family Tortricidae. It is found in Brazil.

The wingspan is about 20 mm. The ground colour of the forewings is dark orange, with distinct bluish refractive marks. The hindwings are pale orange with strong blackish apical and subapical strips.

References

Moths described in 2009
Rubropsichia
Moths of South America
Taxa named by Józef Razowski